Milam County is a county located in the U.S. state of Texas. As of the 2020 census, its population was 24,754. The county seat is Cameron. The county was created in 1834 as a municipality in Mexico and organized as a county in 1837. Milam County is named for Benjamin Rush Milam, an early settler and a soldier in the Texas Revolution.

Geography

Major highways
  U.S. Highway 77
  U.S. Highway 79
  U.S. Highway 190
  State Highway 36

Adjacent counties
 Falls County (north)
 Robertson County (northeast)
 Burleson County (southeast)
 Lee County (south)
 Williamson County (southwest)
 Bell County (northwest)

Demographics

Note: the US Census treats Hispanic/Latino as an ethnic category. This table excludes Latinos from the racial categories and assigns them to a separate category. Hispanics/Latinos can be of any race.

As of the census of 2000,  24,238 people, 9,199 households, and 6,595 families were residing in the county. The 10,866 housing units averaged . The racial makeup of the county was 78.89% White, 11.05% African American, 0.50% Native American, 0.22% Asian, 7.71% from other races, and 1.63% from two or more races. About 18.63% of the population were Hispanics or Latinos of any race. By ancestry, 16.7% were of American, 16.1% German, 7.2% English, and 6.8% Irish  according to Census 2000.

Of the 9,199 households,  32.40% had children under the age of 18 living with them, 56.50% were married couples living together, 11.30% had a female householder with no husband present, and 28.30% were not families. About 25.90% were single-person households, and 14.10% had someone living alone who was 65 or older.  The average household size was 2.59, and the average family size was 3.11.

In the county, the age distribution was 27.50% under 18, 7.70% from 18 to 24, 24.70% from 25 to 44, 22.90% from 45 to 64, and 17.20% who were 65 or older.  The median age was 38 years. For every 100 females, there were 96.10 males.  For every 100 females age 18 and over, there were 90.60 males.

The median income for a household in the county was $33,186, and for a family was $40,431. Males had a median income of $30,149 versus $20,594 for females. The per capita income for the county was $16,920.  About 12.20% of families and 15.90% of the population were below the poverty line, including 21.80% of those under age 18 and 15.30% of those age 65 or over.

Education
Six independent school districts are present in Milam County:
 Buckholts Independent School District
 Cameron Independent School District
 Gause Independent School District
 Milano Independent School District
 Rockdale Independent School District
 Thorndale Independent School District

Four additional districts extend into parts of Milam County, but are based in neighboring counties: Bartlett, Caldwell, Holland, and Rosebud-Lott.

St. Paul Lutheran SchoolSt. Paul Lutheran Church and School, Thorndale in Thorndale, a private institution, serves students from prekindergarten through grade 8.

Temple Junior College District is the designated community college for county residents in Bartlett, Buckholts, Cameron, Rockdale, Rosebud-Lott, and Thorndale ISDs. Blinn College is the designated community college for county residents in Gause, Lexington, and Milano ISDs.

Communities

Cities
 Cameron (county seat)
 Milano
 Rockdale
 Thorndale (small part in Williamson County)

Town
 Buckholts

Census-designated places
 Ben Arnold
 Burlington
 Gause
 Praesel

Unincorporated communities
 Branchville
 Corinth
 Davilla
 Marak
 Pettibone
 San Gabriel
 Val Verde

Ghost towns

 Briary
 Bryant Station
 Bushdale
 Clarkson
 Duncan

 Nashville
 Nile
 Port Sullivan

 Sipe Springs

Politics

See also

 National Register of Historic Places listings in Milam County, Texas
 Recorded Texas Historic Landmarks in Milam County

References

External links
 Milam County government website
 Informational website about the county
 Genealogical and historical informational website about the county
 

 
1837 establishments in the Republic of Texas
Populated places established in 1837